The Beach (Italian: La spiaggia) also internationally released as Riviera and The Boarder) is a 1954 French-Italian comedy drama film directed by Alberto Lattuada and starring Martine Carol, Raf Vallone and Mario Carotenuto. In 2008 the film was selected to enter the list of the 100 Italian films to be saved.

The film's sets were designed by the art director Dario Cecchi. It was shot at the Titanus Studios in Rome and on location around Savona in Liguria.

Plot
At a luxury resort on the Italian coast, a prostitute takes her young daughter for a vacation but tries to conceal her true profession from her fellow guests. She is courted by the local mayor, before her past is exposed to the gossipy society of the resort.

Cast 
Martine Carol as Anna Maria Mentorsi
Raf Vallone as Silvio, il sindaco di Pontorno
Mario Carotenuto as Carlo Albertocchi
Carlo Romano as Luigi
Clelia Matania as la signora Albertocchi
Carlo Bianco as Chiastrino, il milionario
Nico Pepe as ex-fumatore magro 
Mara Berni as la signora Marini 
Valeria Moriconi as Gughi, l'esistenzialista
Marcella Rovena as Luigina, moglie di Roberto
Rosy Mazzacurati as la signora snob
Marco Ferreri as ex-fumatore grasso
Ennio Girolami as Riccardo

References

Bibliography
 Bayman, Louis. Directory of World Cinema: Italy. Intellect Books, 2011.

External links

1954 films
Films directed by Alberto Lattuada
1954 comedy-drama films
Italian comedy-drama films
French comedy-drama films
Titanus films
1950s Italian-language films
Films set in Liguria
1950s Italian films
1950s French films